
Siemiatycze County is a unit of territorial administration and local government (powiat) in Podlaskie Voivodeship, north-eastern Poland, on the border with Belarus. It came into being on January 1, 1999, as a result of the Polish local government reforms passed in 1998.

As of 2019 its total population is 44,366, out of which the population of Siemiatycze is 14,418, that of Drohiczyn is 1,970, and the rural population is 27,978.

Neighbouring counties
Siemiatycze County is bordered by Biała Podlaska County and Łosice County to the south, Siedlce County to the south-west, Sokołów County to the west, Wysokie Mazowieckie County and Bielsk County to the north, and Hajnówka County to the north-east. It also borders Belarus to the east.

Administrative division
The county is subdivided into nine gminas (one urban, one urban-rural and seven rural). These are listed in the following table, in descending order of population.

References

 
Siemiatycze